Penn & Teller Get Killed is a 1989 black comedy film directed by Arthur Penn, starring the magicians Penn & Teller, who play themselves in a satirical account of what the audience would perhaps imagine them doing in their daily lives. Most of the action involves Penn and Teller playing practical jokes on each other and Penn's girlfriend, Carlotta (Caitlin Clarke). The final joke, as the title implies, has serious consequences for all three. It was the last theatrical film directed by Arthur Penn, and received mostly negative reviews from critics.

Plot 
Penn and Teller appear on a television show where Penn jokingly comments that he wishes someone were trying to kill him. Soon after, the magicians are off to a scheduled show in Atlantic City. At the airport, a religious zealot confronts Penn about his comments from the television show the night before. Teller and Carlotta play a prank on Penn while going through security and Penn gets back at Teller by planting a toy gun on him while at the airport.

After exposing fraudulent psychic surgery to Carlotta's wealthy Uncle Ernesto, Penn and Teller are kidnapped by angry Filipinos wishing revenge for damaging their reputation. Immediately before being brutally tortured, the situation is revealed to Penn as a birthday prank played by Teller, Carlotta and Uncle Ernesto.

Soon after, while leaving the theatre from their nightly performance, someone opens fire on Penn, shooting him in the arm. Teller is accused of hiring an assassin as a joke, but as time goes on it becomes clear that Teller is not part of the joke. Teller purchases a gun for self-defense and femme fatale Officer MacNamara vows to keep Penn safe from snipers.

Officer MacNamara announces that a nameless villain, a supposed vehement Penn & Teller fan who dresses and acts like Penn, has been arrested. Penn and Teller get to tour his bizarre apartment turned Penn & Teller shrine. Teller innocuously disposes of his gun in a trashcan of the apartment. Shortly after MacNamara departs, Penn is stabbed in the stomach by an assailant on the street. Penn rushes off to hospital where, once Teller is out of sight, he appears perfectly fine. Teller proceeds to pursue the would-be assassin in a peculiar chase scene back to the apartment.

The madman, dressed as Penn, forces Teller to enact a Penn & Teller routine with him, hanging in gravity boots in front of a camera. He then uses duct tape to secure the hapless Teller to the gravity boot rig.  Officer MacNamara returns and the assassin leaves to finish off Penn. MacNamara confesses to Teller her contempt of Penn and Teller.  The confused Teller is able to grab the gun from the wastebasket and threatens MacNamara with it.  He hears a voice behind him and as the individual grabs him, he shoots the individual only to realize it's Penn, who appears to fall over dead.

MacNamara laughs, thinking that it's a new joke. She then reveals herself as Carlotta. The implications of what has just happened suddenly catch up with them: The whole event had been a joke on Teller who turned everything around on the players. Teller, breaking silence for the first time, immediately thinks they switched the gun for a replica, but then realizes the gun he was holding is real and he just killed his partner. Teller turns the gun on himself.

Carlotta, stricken with grief, throws herself out the window. Upon returning to his apartment and finding everyone dead, the "hired assassin", realizing he'll certainly be implicated in the deaths, shoots himself. Others who come into the apartment and find the carnage shoot themselves. Gunshots are heard in the distance, while the Bee Gees song "I Started a Joke" plays in the background. In a voice over, Penn explains this is the definitive end of it all.

Reception 
Quentin Tarantino has said that this film exemplifies the poor quality of directors' final movies.

Cast 
 Penn Jillette as himself
 Teller as himself
 Caitlin Clarke as Carlotta
 Celia McGuire as Officer McNamara
 David Patrick Kelly as The Fan
 Leonardo Cimino as Ernesto
 Bill Randolph as Floor Director
 Jon Cryer as Frat Boy

References

External links 
 
 
 
 Sight & Sound review

1980s black comedy films
1989 comedy films
1989 films
American black comedy films
American comedy-drama films
Films about magic and magicians
Films directed by Arthur Penn
Films scored by Paul Chihara
Films shot in Atlantic City, New Jersey
Films shot in New York City
Films with screenplays by Penn Jillette
Films with screenplays by Teller (magician)
Warner Bros. films
1980s English-language films
1980s American films